Deeside Leisure Centre is a sports centre located in Queensferry, Flintshire. Its facilities include Deeside Ice Rink (an Olympic-sized inline hockey rink), badminton courts, and squash courts. The centre was the venue for the 1974 Wightman Cup match.

The ice rink is the National Centre for Ice Sports in Wales and is home to the Deeside Dragons, the Flintshire Phantoms and the Deeside Demons ice hockey teams.  It was used as a temporary home by the Manchester Phoenix during the 2006–07 EIHL season while the Altrincham Ice Dome was being constructed. The Phoenix moved back to Deeside for the 2015/16 Season after they were evicted from Altrincham by the rink's owners. There has also been a new indoor skate park and gym added to the Leisure Centre.

Administration
The Leisure Centre is run and controlled by Flintshire County Council which also governs similar leisure centres in towns such as Buckley, Mold and Connah's Quay. It offers an 'actif' membership which offers reduced admission prices over standard admission.

Music Venue
As well as sports and sporting events, Deeside Leisure Centre has also been used as a venue for music events. Yes performed there in 1980; Genesis performed at the Centre in 1982; Iron Maiden performed there in 1980; and Bob Marley & The Wailers performed in 1980 as well.

Deeside Rainbow Hospital
During the 2020-21 COVID-19 pandemic it was converted to the site of the Deeside Rainbow Hospital, and used as a vaccination centre.

References

External links
Deeside Leisure Centre
Deeside Ice Rink

Indoor ice hockey venues in Wales